Power FM is an English language radio station broadcasting around the globe.

Power FM began broadcasting in October 1995 using a small 1 W FM transmitter on a roof in Los Gigantes. Over the years, it became the largest English speaking radio station in Spain. At the height of the success of the station, the website had over 2.000.000 hits every month, with visitors from all over the world, webcams, studios on all the major Canary Islands and 24-hour broadcasting.

The station was sold to a private firm in 2006, and it closed on June 30, 2010. In 2013 the station returned to the air with a team of former presenters.

Early days 
On October 22, 1995, Power FM began broadcasting on 91.6 fm to the village of Los Gigantes in Tenerife's south-west.  Its founder, Gavin Watson, hosted the first program. In the early days, the station was based in the back room of an electronics shop.

Within two years coverage had expanded to the entire south coast of Tenerife, including Los Cristianos and Las Americas.

Network expansion 
In 2001, Power FM was broadcasting to Tenerife, La Gomera and Gran Canaria, and in 2002 it launched in Lanzarote, giving Power FM the most English-language radio coverage in the Canaries. At this time the station went through a period of rebranding, dropping the former slogan "Your Friendly Radio Station" to adopt a new one, "Seven Islands, One Station". In 2003, recognizing some in the Gran Canaria area could not receive the station, two additional transmitter sites were set up to expand the network.

2006 re-launch 
In 2006, Power FM was bought by Kaldec Investments S.L. and the station went through a period of development, including new studios in Tenerife, Lanzarote and Gran Canaria.

Power FM also set up a classic hit station called Gold FM.

On the 30 June 2010, the station ceased broadcasting and went off air for a period of three years.

Slogans / taglines 
1995 - 2001 - Your Friendly Radio Station
2001 - 2005 - Seven Islands, One Station
2005 – 2010 - The Canaries Best Music Variety
2012 - current - Music too good to Turn Down

Return to air

In 2012 former members of the team were in discussion about restarting the station in an internet only format, with an aim to using the station as a test bed for a syndication platform. Discussions with station operators was ongoing, and in early 2013 the station returned to the airwaves in Lanzarote and Fuerteventura, and shortly afterwards in Tenerife and the western Canary Islands.

The station renamed itself to PowerON FM in 2013, in partnership with TravelON.WORLD.

Both operations in Lanzarote and Tenerife are independent of each other with separate presenter line up's and management teams on each station.

Programming & current presenters 

Tenerife Presenters
Neil Breakwell, Mel Faulkner, Dave Scott, Roscoe & Adi Benson.

Lanzarote Presenters
Danny Looker, Paul Baker, Jules Weakley, Spencer James, David Webster, Dave Adams, Mark Dodson, Si Kennett, Craig Trapps, Richard Spinks, Chicane & Paul Van Dyk.

PowerON FM also broadcasts syndicated radio programmes such as Airplay40 with Spencer James, The Daily Mix, Go retro and Sister Bliss.

Previous presenters 
Previous presenters have included: Andy Grey (Now on Nova Radio North East), Carl Hartley (Now at Lakeland Radio and Radio Wave in the UK),Gillian King, Bob Preston, Chris Larkman, Theresa Willson, Keith Holden, Rob "That Man" Astley, "Pony" Paul Marley, Mack Ballantyne, Paul Webb, Helga Ekdahl, Danny Looker, Juan the Man, Martin Allen, Simon Reiterbund (also known as Simon Ritter), Roy England, Heather Richardson, Grant Davis and Steve Christian (Ken Burkitt), Ricky Porter, Dominic James, Dawnie D, Val Richardson, Gordon King, Katy Kennedy, Pete Quilty, Hollie Bourne, Eddie Hastings, Adam Marks, Kim Robson, John Sharples, Steve Gerald, Mike Smith, Steve Fletcher, Rick O'Shay, Phil Crean, Steve Sommers, Angela Blackburn

Power FM also rebroadcast some programmes from BBC World Service.

References 

Radio stations in Tenerife
Contemporary hit radio stations
Radio stations established in 1995
Companies of the Canary Islands